Pyotr Ivanovich Kafarov (Pre-reform Russian: Петръ Ива́новичъ Кафа́ровъ; Modern Russian: Пётр Ива́нович Кафа́ров), also known by his monastic name Palladius (Pre-reform Russian: Палла́дій; Modern Russian: Палла́дий; 29 September 1817, Chistopol – 18 December 1878, Marseille), was an early Russian sinologist.

Biography
Kafarov was born in the family of an Orthodox priest. He studied in Kazan seminary and Saint-Petersbourg Academy, from which was sent to the Russian Orthodox Mission in China.

Like his teacher Hyacinth (Bichurin), Palladius was a Russian Orthodox monk. During his stay in China, he discovered and published many invaluable manuscripts, including The Secret History of the Mongols.

During his scholarly career, Kafarov's works focused on Chinese linguistics, history, geography, and religion. Kafarov notably translated many Buddhist scriptures from Chinese, Mongolian, and Tibetan. Kafarov also studied the history of Christianity in imperial China and helped pioneer the study of Chinese Islam.

For more than three decades, Archimandrite Palladius headed the Russian Orthodox mission in China and held ethnographic and linguistic research there.

Kafarov designed a Cyrillization system for the Chinese language, known as the Palladius system.  This system has remained the basis for official transcription of Chinese personal and geographical names in Russia ever since.

The Chinese-Russian Dictionary composed by Archimandrite Palladius remains a well-known work even today.

Works 
 《漢俄合璧韻編》掌院修士巴第遺篇，1888年，北京同文舘 (Chinese-Russian Dictionary by Archimandrite Palladius, 1888, Tungwen Guan) Volume 1 Volume 2 1896 edition

See also 
 Cyrillization of Chinese
 «Elucidations of the Marco Polo’s Travels in North-China» («Journal of the North-China Branch of the R. As. Soc.», vol. X, 1876)
 «The Road from Beijing to Blagoveschinsk» (The journal of the Royal Geographic Society of London, Volume 42, J. Murray, 1872)

References

1817 births
1878 deaths
People from Chistopol
Lexicographers from the Russian Empire
Sinologists from the Russian Empire
Chinese Orthodox Church
Eastern Orthodox missionaries
Russian Orthodox monks
Archimandrites
Monks from the Russian Empire
Expatriates from the Russian Empire in China
Missionary linguists
19th-century lexicographers